Tevfik Altındağ (born 26 October 1988) is a German professional footballer of Turkish descent who plays as a midfielder for an amateur side Türkspor Neckarsulm.

Career
Born in Böblingen, West Germany, Altındağ began his career with SV Böblingen. He later joined the youth team of SSV Reutlingen and in the summer of 2007 was scouted by Ankaragücü. On 10 November 2007 he played his debut game for Ankaragücü against Gaziantepspor and scored his only goal for Ankaragücü on 30 March 2008 against Bursaspor.

After eight games and one goal in a one and a half year spell, he signed  with Sivasspor on 14 January 2009, making his debut on 7 February 2009 against Kocaelispor.

References

External links
 Fantezi Fanatik Profile
 

1988 births
People from Böblingen
Sportspeople from Stuttgart (region)
Footballers from Baden-Württemberg
German people of Turkish descent
Living people
German footballers
Turkish footballers
Association football midfielders
MKE Ankaragücü footballers
Sivasspor footballers
Kocaelispor footballers
Eyüpspor footballers
SSV Reutlingen 05 players
SGV Freiberg players
Adanaspor footballers
Altay S.K. footballers
Giresunspor footballers
Adana Demirspor footballers
Ankaraspor footballers
Süper Lig players
TFF First League players
TFF Second League players
Oberliga (football) players
Regionalliga players